Jahonotin Uvaysiy (1780–1845) was a Sufi poet from Margilon in the Ferghana Valley in Uzbekistan. She was an Otin-Oys, an Uzbek religious woman held in great esteem.

She produced over 15,000 hemistiches of verse and it is still popular in Uzbekistan today. The Institute of the Academy of Science of the Republic of Uzbekistan in Tashkent has a collection of her works.
Her father, Siddik Bobo, was an  admirer of literature who wrote poems in two languages. Her mother, Chinbibi was also an otin.

Bibliography

Uvaysiy. Devon. Tashkent, 1963
Uvaysiy. Ko’ngil gulzori (The flower-bed of the soul). Tashkent, 1983.
E.Ibrohimova. Uvaysiy. Tashkent, 1963.
T.Jalolov. O’zbek shoiralari. (Uzbek poetess). Tashkent, 1970.
I.Hakkulov. Uvaysiy she’riyati. (The poetry of Uvaysi). Tashkent, 1982.

References

Uzbekistani women poets
1780 births
1845 deaths
19th-century Uzbekistani poets
19th-century women writers

Female Sufi mystics
Women scholars of Islam
Female Islamic religious leaders
Sufi poets